Burlington Central High School is a public middle school and high school in Burlington, Ontario, Canada, in the Halton District School Board. Enrollment was 686 students in September 2008. The current school building was constructed in 1922 and has been added to extensively over the years. The last major addition was made in the 1965, which added a new technical wing and gymnasiums. In 2012 the auditorium was upgraded with new seats and equipment. The school raised funds through community donations and fundraisers. Originally called "Burlington High School", it is the oldest operating high school in Burlington.

The longest serving principal, J. M. Bates, started at the school in 1929 and served until 1964.

Many B.C.H.S. students fought in the Second World War and are commemorated in the school's War Memorial.

Academically, Burlington Central High School was ranked as the #1 high school in Burlington, according to the 2011 Fraser Institute Report.

The parents and students of Burlington Central High School mounted a substantial campaign in October 2016 when the Preliminary Report of the Director of Education of the Halton District School Board made the recommendation to close Burlington Central High School along with Lester B. Pearson High School. The #CentralStrong campaign rallied the support of families and businesses, local media, and gathered reams of information to substantiate the financial and community costs of closing Burlington's downtown high school..  In the Director's final report, the recommendation to close BCHS was dropped, and in May 2017 following a "Program Accessibility Review Committee" process, the Board's trustees voted instead to close Lester B. Pearson and Robert Bateman High Schools .

Athletic Hall of Fame
This list is not complete. There have been many other championships over the 97-year history of the school.
Tony Gabriel
Ian Sunter
Jake Ireland
Don McFarlane
Cathy Phillips

Clubs and activities
Student Council
Athletic Council
World Club
Anime Club
Inclusiveness Team
Glee Club
FIRST Robotics
Gay–straight alliance
Eco Team
Link Crew
Student Senate

Notable alumni
Mark Oldershaw, Olympic bronze medallist.
Adam J. Harrington, Canadian actor, voice actor and producer.
Sinéad Russell, Canadian Olympic swimmer.

See also
List of high schools in Ontario

References

External links
Official web site

Educational institutions established in 1922
High schools in Burlington, Ontario
1922 establishments in Ontario